KUQL (98.3 FM, "Kool 98") is a radio station licensed to serve Ethan, South Dakota.  The station is owned by Saga Communications and licensed to Saga Communications of South Dakota, LLC. It airs an oldies music format.

The station was assigned the KUQL call letters by the Federal Communications Commission on July 11, 2001.

References

External links
KUQL official website

UQL
Oldies radio stations in the United States
Jerauld County, South Dakota
Mass media in the Mitchell, South Dakota micropolitan area
Mitchell, South Dakota micropolitan area